Samuel S. Verzosa Jr. is a Filipino businessman who is known for being the co-founder of the multi-level marketing company, Frontrow. He is also serving as the representative of the Tutok To Win Party-List in the House of Representatives.

Early life and education 
Samuel Verzosa Jr. was born in September 1987. He is the eldest son of five siblings, spent his childhood growing up in Sampaloc, Manila. He attended Angelicum College for his elementary and high school studies while he took up a degree in civil engineering when he entered the University of the Philippines Diliman.

Career

Business career
Verzosa learned about the direct selling and multi-level marketing (MLM) industries while he was preparing for his engineering board examinations. He joined a direct selling company where he met RS Francisco. When the company closed, the two decided to establish Frontrow International in 2009. Frontrow also maintains the E-Skwela program, where the MLM provides Internet and printing hubs for school-use in far-flung areas as part of its corporate social responsibility. Frontrow has partnered with the Ang Probinsyano Partylist for this program's implementation.

Frontrow also sponsored Willie Revillame's Tutok to Win program. Revillame is a close friend of Verzosa. Frontrow is also a partner of the Miss Universe Organization.

Verzosa also manages the Modena Motorsports company, which distributes Maserati cars in the Philippines.

Political career
Verzosa was  named as first nominee of the Tutok To Win Party-List for the 2022 elections. The organization manage to win a seat.

As House representatives for the 19th Congress, Verzosa became vice-chairman of the Poverty Alleviation, Social Services, Welfare of Children, and Disaster Resilience committees. Among his bills filed are the Poor Job Applicants Discount Act which seeks to provide 20 percent discount to government-issued pre-employment documents for indigent jobseekers and the E-Skwela Act which aimed to institutionalize Frontrow's E-Skwela program under the government.

Personal life
Verzosa has actress Rhian Ramos as his girlfriend. He first publicized his relationship with Ramos in August 2022.

References 

21st-century Filipino politicians

1987 births
Living people
21st-century Filipino businesspeople
Filipino company founders
Multi-level marketing
Party-list members of the House of Representatives of the Philippines